Texas Is the Reason was an American post-hardcore band founded by former Shelter guitarist Norman Brannon and 108 drummer Chris Daly in 1994. They disbanded in 1997, and held brief reunions in 2006 and 2012–2013.

History

Formation, Do You Know Who You Are? and break-up (1994–97)
Norman Brannon (a.k.a. Norm Arenas), guitarist for Krishnacore band Shelter, formed Texas Is the Reason with friend and fellow Krishna devotee Chris Daly (formerly of 108) in New York City. Both wished to leave the macho attitude and religious preaching of their former projects. Ex-Fountainhead member Scott Winegard (bass) was the next to join, after which guitarist and vocalist Garrett Klahn (formerly of Buffalo-based Copper and Support) was recruited to round out the quartet.

The name "Texas Is the Reason" is lifted from a Misfits song, entitled "Bullet". It also refers to a conspiracy theory about the assassination of John F. Kennedy, in which the president was killed in a plot arranged by Texas Democrats in order to give Lyndon B. Johnson control of the White House. Upon the release of their self-titled debut EP, Texas Is the Reason became an underground smash, and helped usher in an era of similar-sounding bands. The same year (1995) also saw the release of a split single with Samuel, through British record label Simba. The band continued pushing forward in 1996, with the release of their first (and only) full-length album, Do You Know Who You Are?, followed by a split single with The Promise Ring through Jade Tree. 

The title Do You Know Who You Are? was reportedly named after the last statement John Lennon heard prior to his death. Produced by Jawbox's J.Robbins and released on Revelation Records, the album drew considerable attention from major labels, as Texas Is the Reason had been pegged as "the next big thing" due to the growing punk explosion on MTV. Song titles from the album, such as "The Magic Bullet Theory" and "Back and to the Left", were further allusions to various Kennedy assassination theories. 

On the eve of signing with Capitol Records in 1997, the band flew overseas for a European tour. At this stage, the reality of being on a major label had caused considerable tension within the band. Before their final tour stop in Bielefeld, Germany, Daly and Brannon agreed that if the show was "awesome", it would be their last. Brannon later related, "I walked on stage and we opened with 'Antique' and when Garrett started singing, there were eight hundred Germans singing along with us. I looked at Daly and knew that this was over."

Post-break-up and reunions (1998–present)
The former members headed off to various musical projects, with Klahn forming New Rising Sons (1998) and Solea (2001) with Serge Lobokoff of Samiam. Daly concurrently started indie outfit Jets to Brazil  with Blake Schwartzenbach of Jawbreaker. Winegard began releasing various bands' records through an imprint label he co-owns called GrapeOS, while playing in the band Americans. The only member to go inactive in the world of indie rock was guitarist Norman Brannon, who moved to Chicago and worked as a DJ for almost three years.

Winegard and Brannon joined Charlie Walker of Chamberlain and Jonah Matranga of Far and Onelinedrawing to form the band New End Original, which lasted from 2000 to 2003. Klahn's New Rising Sons released two EPs through GrapeOS, were dropped by Virgin Records, and then disbanded; he now plays in the band Atlantic/Pacific with John Herguth of House & Parish. New Rising Sons eventually reformed in 2008. Daly left the now-defunct Jets to Brazil sometime after their 2002 release, Perfecting Loneliness. 

After nine years apart, Texas Is the Reason decided to reunite to mark the tenth anniversary of the release of Do You Know Who You Are. A single show was scheduled for New York City's Irving Plaza on November 25, 2006, but a second show was added for the following night due to an unexpectedly quick sell-out of the first show. In interviews leading up to the reunion, the band noted their long-time disappointment at not playing a final show in their home city. The band also insisted that the reunion shows were a one-time event, and that they had no plans for further shows: "While we empathize with everyone who wants to come to the show, but can't come for any reason, this will not become a tour and we are not reforming the band. That is as clear a statement as anyone can make." Winegard, along with members of other emo bands, formed House & Parish in June 2007.

In January 2012, it was announced that Revelation Records would be holding a 25th anniversary celebration at The Glass House in Pomona, California in July of the same year. The band was approached to reunite once more, but ultimately refused the opportunity. Daly, however, traveled to California for the show, featuring a reunited Quicksand, and returned excited about the prospect of another reunion for Texas is the Reason. The band then agreed to headline the opening night of Revelation's east coast event in October 2012 at New York's Irving Plaza. The show sold out immediately upon going on sale, and the band announced a second night held at the Music Hall of Williamsburg. Daly was quoted as saying, "It's like we have this really cool old car that's in really great shape…it's not built for, like, a cross-country trip, but it's good to take out and drive around the neighborhood."

After a European tour, Texas Is the Reason played their final reunion show at the Electric Ballroom in London on August 4, 2013. Subsequent performances included a 20th anniversary show for Do You Know Who You Are? (March 15, 2016),  and a memorial concert for Jon Bunch.

Discography

Albums
Do You Know Who You Are? (1996, Revelation)
Your Choice Live Series 037 – Split live album with Samiam. (1999, Your Choice)

EPs
Texas Is the Reason – Also called If It's Here When We Get Back It's Ours. (1995, Revelation)
Split 7" with Samuel (1995, Simba Recordings and Art Monk Construction)
Split 7" with The Promise Ring (1996, Jade Tree)

Notes

External links

 Official website
 Texas Is the Reason on Myspace
 Texas Is the Reason on Jade Tree Records
 Texas Is the Reason on Revelation Records
 Texas Is the Reason on Your Choice Records
 Texas Is the Reason Detailed Discography
 Reunion Q&A on Aversion
 Scanner Zine interview with Norman Brannon

American emo musical groups
Indie rock musical groups from New York (state)
Musical groups established in 1994
Musical groups disestablished in 1997
Musical groups from New York City
Revelation Records artists
Jade Tree (record label) artists